Littlebeck is a hamlet in the North York Moors National Park, near Whitby, in North Yorkshire, England. It stands on the Little Beck, a minor tributary of the River Esk.

The actor Joanne Froggatt was born and raised in Littlebeck.

References

 http://www.eskvalley.com/littlebeck/

Hamlets in North Yorkshire
Borough of Scarborough